Buni ben Gurion (Būnī ben-Gūryōn), also called Nicodemus ( Naqdīmōn), was a wealthy Jewish man who lived in Jerusalem in the 1st century AD. He is believed by some to be identical to the Nicodemus mentioned in the Gospel of John. Elsewhere he is discussed in Josephus' history, The Jewish War, and later, rabbinic works: Lamentations Rabbah, Ecclesiastes Rabbah, the Babylonian Talmud, and Avot of Rabbi Natan.

Ben Gurion means "son of Gurion", the Hebrew patronymic, and his personal name was apparently Buni or Bunai.

Nicodemus appears to have been a wealthy and respected figure, known for his holiness and generosity. He was an opponent of the Zealots and of the Jewish rebellion against the Roman Empire which led to the destruction of Jerusalem.

When Vespasian became emperor, Nicodemus sought peace with the emperor's son Titus, who was conducting the war. He agitated against the prosecution of the war by the Zealots. In retaliation, they destroyed the stores of provisions that he and his friends had accumulated for the use of pilgrims.

References 

Followers of Jesus
Talmud people
1st-century Jews
Gospel of John
Nicodemus
People of the First Jewish–Roman War